Zelenga is a rural locality (a selo) in Marfinsky Selsoviet of Volodarsky District, Astrakhan Oblast, Russia. The population was 2,834 as of 2010. There are 22 streets.

Geography 
Zelenga is located 32 km south of Volodarsky (the district's administrative centre) by road. Makovo is the nearest rural locality.

References 

Rural localities in Volodarsky District, Astrakhan Oblast